Michel Ferté  (8 December 1958 – 4 January 2023) was a French professional racing driver. He was the younger brother of Alain Ferté, who is also a professional racing driver.

Ferté competed five seasons in Formula 3000 from 1985 to 1989.

Ferté died on 4 January 2023, at the age of 64.

Career

24 Hours of Le Mans results

European Formula Two Championship results
(key) (Races in bold indicate pole position; races in italics indicate fastest lap)

Complete International Formula 3000 results
(key) (Races in bold indicate pole position; races in italics indicate fastest lap.)

External links

References 

1958 births
2023 deaths
People from Falaise, Calvados
French racing drivers
French Formula Three Championship drivers
International Formula 3000 drivers
24 Hours of Le Mans drivers
World Sportscar Championship drivers
Sportspeople from Calvados (department)
Oreca drivers
Jaguar Racing drivers